The Senior women's race at the 2007 IAAF World Cross Country Championships was held at the Mombasa Golf Course in Mombasa, Kenya, on March 24, 2007.  Reports of the event were given in the Herald, and for the IAAF.

Complete results for individuals, and for teams were published.

Race results

Senior women's race (8 km)

Individual

†: Binnaz Uslu from  did not finish, but was disqualified because of doping violations.

Teams

Note: Athletes in parentheses did not score for the team result.

Participation
According to an unofficial count, 94 athletes from 30 countries participated in the Senior women's race.  This is in agreement with the official numbers as published.

 (1)
 (5)
 (1)
 (3)
 (2)
 (1)
 (5)
 (6)
 (1)
 (1)
 (1)
 (2)
 (6)
 (6)
 (1)
 (6)
 (1)
 (1)
 (2)
 (4)
 (6)
 (1)
 (1)
 (5)
 (6)
 (2)
 (6)
 (5)
 (4)
 (2)

See also
 2007 IAAF World Cross Country Championships – Senior men's race
 2007 IAAF World Cross Country Championships – Junior men's race
 2007 IAAF World Cross Country Championships – Junior women's race

References

Senior women's race at the World Athletics Cross Country Championships
IAAF World Cross Country Championships
2007 in women's athletics